Hendricus Theodorus Wijdeveld (The Hague, 4 October 1885 - Nijmegen, 20 February 1987) was a Dutch architect and graphic designer. He was an important figure of the Amsterdam School and is known for his work as editor-in-chief for the Wendingen magazine.

Life and work 
Wijdeveld started his career at the architectural firm of Jacques van Straaten and the studio of Pierre Cuypers. He then worked in France as an assistant to the architect Louis Cordonnier. He returned to Amsterdam in 1914. From 1914 to 1940, he completes his main designs:

 1920-1921: Bendien Residence
 1922-1927: Villa De Wachter
 1927: Plan West Amsterdam
 1928: Villa de Bouw
 1936: Tilburg villa

He is also known for his futuristic projects:

 1918: A vagina shaped building for the People's theater 
 A reforestation project for Amsterdam 
 The 'Plan the impossible' project

Editor for Wendingen 
From 1918 to 1932, Wijdeveld was the editor-in-chief of the magazine Wendingen, a publication for the architecture association Architectura et Amicitia. The magazine is known for its groundbreaking architectural approach to typography. It also was an important platform for several modernist movements in the Netherlands.

War period 
Wijdeveld published a book titled De Nieuwe Orde (The New Order) in 1940, suggesting his sympathy for the German occupation. As a result, he fell out of public favor, but appears to have been rehabilitated after the war since the Stedelijk Museum, a major national museum in Amsterdam, dedicated a major retrospective to him in 1953.

Teaching 
Wijdeveld taught in America between 1947 and 1952 at the invitation of Frank Lloyd Wright. In 1949–1950, he was a visiting professor at NC State College's School of Design.

Family 
Wijdeveld was married to the cellist Ellen Philippine Kohn, then to the actress Charlotte Köhler. He has one daughter, illustrator Ruscha Wijdeveld, and two sons, Wolfgang Wijdeveld and Roland Matthijs Wijdeveld.

See also 
List of Dutch architects

Publications about Wijdeveld 

 Jean-Paul Baeten & Aaron Betsky: Design the impossible. The world of architect Hendrik Wijdeveld (1885-1987). Rotterdam, NAI Publishers, 2006. 
 H.Th. Wijdeveld, 50 years of creative work. Architecture and urbanism, ideal projects, theatre, sets, costumes, typography, Wendingen, decorative work, publications, books. Inl. by W.M. Dudok. Amsterdam, Stedelijk Museum Amsterdam, 1953

References 

Dutch architects
Dutch centenarians
Men centenarians
1885 births
1987 deaths